Kingsway West is a neighborhood of St. Louis, Missouri.  The Kingsway West neighborhood is defined by Union Boulevard to its north-west and Dr. Martin Luther King Drive to its south-west. Natural Bridge Avenue forms its north-east boundary and North Kingshighway is its southeast boundary.

Characteristics

The Academy neighborhood has a mix of large single-family homes as well as two and four-family structures. Kings Heights is a newer development of condominiums and attached townhomes in a private setting. The area is experiencing new residential construction on Norwood Square. There is a stretch of businesses and other commercial uses along Natural Bridge Boulevard which goes through the neighborhood.

Churches

 Cote Brilliante Presbyterian Church 4673 Labadie Avenue, St. Louis, MO 63115.
 Friendly Missionary Baptist Church 5164 Lexington Avenue, St. Louis, MO 63115
 Immanuel Lutheran Church 3540 Marcus (at Lexington), St. Louis, MO 63115.
 Memorial Boulevard Christian Church 3000 North Kingshighway, St. Louis, MO 63114.
 Most Blessed Sacrament Catholic Church 5017 Northland Avenue, St. Louis, MO 63113.

Demographics

In 2020 Kingshighway West's population was 89.6% Black, 7.0% White, 0.1% Native American, and 2.6% Two or More Races. 0.6% of the population was of Hispanic or Latino origin.

References

External links
 Kingsway West neighborhood website

Neighborhoods in St. Louis